Masland is a surname

List of people with the surname 

 Albert Masland (born 1956), American politician
 Kim Masland, Canadian politician

See also 

 Maslandapur

Surnames
English-language surnames
Surnames of English origin
Surnames of British Isles origin